The Little Waingaro River is a river of the Tasman Region of New Zealand. It is a tributary of the Waingaro River, which it meets 10 kilometres south of Tākaka.

See also
List of rivers of New Zealand

References

Rivers of the Tasman District
Rivers of New Zealand